The Adventures of Chico and Guapo is an American adult animated television series that originally aired on MTV2. Set in New York City, the show is about two interns trying to get ahead in the music business. Chico and Guapo work at Mr. Angelo's recording studio. The series follows their misadventures, and also features Chico and Guapo's commentary on real TV shows while channel surfing in Mr. Angelo's office (similar to Beavis and Butthead, Station Zero, and DJ & the Fro).

Shorts of the cartoon originally aired on The Orlando Jones Show on FX prior to becoming a regular series on MTV2.

Characters
 Chico Bustello (Voiced by Paul D'Acri) – A smart-mouthed janitor of Puerto Rican descent working for Angelo Productions
 Guapo Martinez (Voiced by P. J. Pesce) – An obese janitor from the Dominican Republic who works with Chico
 Concepción Rodriguez (Voiced by Orlando Jones) – A Latina receptionist from the Dominican Republic
 Hank Holiday (Voiced by Orlando Jones) – A gay music producer who gets all the credit for Cezar's work
 Cezar (Voiced by Paul D'Acri) – A producer and a musical genius, Chico's cousin
 Mr. Angelo (full name Frank C. Angelo) (Voiced by P. J. Pesce) – The owner of Angelo Productions, whose wife has been dead for 12 years and whose daughter Sophie is in love with Chico

Episode guide
 1st episode:
 Gelatinous F.A.T
 Affirmative Reaction
 Worker's Comp
 Smackfight
 America's Most Talented Fetus
 2nd episode:
 Pariah Scary
 Too Hot for Teacher
 Santeria
 Gaupo's Dyslexia
 The Gift
 3rd episode:
 Li'l Kwim
 Morcilla Sausage
 Standup Guy
 Cezar's First
 Mr. Angelo's Rug
 4th episode:
 Da Feud
 Enter the Guapo
 Bigfoot
 Y tu Chico, Tambien
 The Hanklick Maneuver

References

External links

 A description of the Season One DVD of Chico and Guapo

2000s American adult animated television series
2000s American LGBT-related animated television series
2000s American musical comedy television series
2000s American workplace comedy television series
2006 American television series debuts
2006 American television series endings
American adult animated adventure television series
American adult animated comedy television series
American adult animated musical television series
English-language television shows
Fictional Dominican American people
Fictional Hispanic and Latino American people
Hispanic and Latino American television
MTV cartoons
MTV2 original programming
Television shows set in New York City
Animated duos